Clark Patterson Lee is a major architecture, engineering and planning firm based in Rochester, New York, with offices located throughout New York as well as offices in North Carolina, South Carolina and Georgia. In 2013 it was joined by Habiterra.

References

External links
Clark Patterson Lee website

Companies based in Rochester, New York